Christian del Tránsito Gálvez Núñez (born 9 December 1979) is a Chilean retired footballer. He finished his career at Magallanes.

External links
 BDFA Profile

1979 births
Living people
Chilean footballers
Santiago Wanderers footballers
Club Deportivo Universidad Católica footballers
Colo-Colo footballers
Club Deportivo Palestino footballers
Cobresal footballers
O'Higgins F.C. footballers
Rangers de Talca footballers
Curicó Unido footballers
Magallanes footballers
Primera B de Chile players
Chilean Primera División players
Association football defenders
People from Cachapoal Province